Ice Cream Everyday  is the fifth studio album from singer-songwriter Amel Larrieux. Originally scheduled for release on August 23, the record was released on October 22, 2013, on her independent label Blisslife Records.  It is her first album in six years following 2007's jazz covers project Lovely Standards and her first recording of all new material since 2006's Morning.

Ice Cream Everyday was produced by Amel's husband Laru Larrieux, who produced all of her studio albums during her solo career. The album was partially recorded and mixed by Eric "Ibo" Butler, who previously worked with Larrieux on the self-titled album by her former group Groove Theory as well as her sophomore effort Bravebird.

The first single "Afraid" was released to radio on June 11, 2013.

Track listing 
 All songs written by Amel Larrieux and Laru Larrieux
  
 Afraid (4:45)
 A Million Sapphires (3:40)
 I Do Take (5:28)
 You Don't See Me (3:28)
 Ur the Shhh (4:45)
 Berries and Cream (4:26)
 Danger (4:34)
 Moment to Reflect (4:27)
 Have You (3:02)
 Orange Glow (4:11)
 See Where You Are (3:47)
 Don't Let Me Down (4:36)
 Trapped Being Human (4:26)
 I Do Take 2 (5:28)
 Soon (2:37)
 Danger 2 (4:32)

Personnel
Credits adapted from liner notes

 Amel Larrieux vocals, piano, keyboards, bass, synths, executive producer
 Laru Larrieux keyboards, synths, bass, drum programming, guitar, sounds, executive producer, recording engineer, mixing
 Keith Witty bass
 Robin Macatangay guitar
 Adrian Harpham drums
 Thomas Piper, Jr. synths, additional programming, electronic snare
 Bahnamous Bowle piano, synth bass
 Sky Larrieux bass, piano, additional vocals, additional mixing
 Sanji-rei Larrieux additional vocals
 Paul Frazier bass
 Jeffery Connors bass
 Sheldon Thwattes drums
 Vincent Richardson organ
 John Notar organ
 George Laks sounds
 Matt Castillo recording engineer
 Eric "Ibo" Butler recording engineer, mixing, additional programming
 Young Michael K "Success" Harris recording engineer, mixing
 Josh Glunta recording engineer (live drums)
 8hz recording engineer, mixing
 Michael Fossenkemper mastering
 Mark Coston art direction, design
 Timothy Hill photography

References

2013 albums
Amel Larrieux albums